The White Dragon is a science fantasy novel by American-Irish author Anne McCaffrey.
It completes the original Dragonriders trilogy in the Dragonriders of Pern series, seven years after the second book. It was first published by Del Rey Books in June 1978.

In 1987, the magazine Locus ranked The White Dragon number 23 among the 33 "All-Time Best Fantasy Novels", based on a poll of subscribers.

Origins
The first part of the novel was published three years earlier as A Time When, a special publication by the New England Science Fiction Association for its annual convention Boskone in 1975, where McCaffrey was Guest of Honor.

Plot summary
The White Dragon follows the coming of age story of Jaxom, the young Lord of Ruatha Hold, who had accidentally impressed the unusual white dragon Ruth in Dragonquest and Dragonsong. As Jaxom grows up, he has to deal with the difficulty of being both a Lord Holder and a dragonrider, the maturity of Ruth (who, besides being white, is a runt), his own teenage angst and desire to fight Thread on his own, and the rebellious Oldtimers, who attempt to steal a golden egg from Benden Weyr. Ruth always knows when he is and can travel through time to avert the growing political crisis. But while fighting Thread, Jaxom falls ill with a potentially deadly sickness called "Fire-Head". This leads him to recuperate in Cove Hold, and while there he discovers some of the mysteries that the Ancients, the ancestors of the Pernese, left behind, and he begins to make more sense of the past.

Awards
The White Dragon placed third for the annual Locus Award for Best Novel and it was one of five nominees for the annual Hugo Award for Best Novel. It won the Gandalf Award for Book-Length Fantasy and the Australian Ditmar Award for international fiction.

The American Library Association in 1999 cited the two early Pern trilogies (Dragonriders and Harper Hall), along with The Ship Who Sang, when McCaffrey received the annual Margaret A. Edwards Award for her "lifetime contribution in writing for teens".

See also

 The Atlas of Pern (1984), a companion book produced by Karen Wynn Fonstad in consultation with McCaffrey.

Notes

References

Citations

External links
 Pern Home – "the website for Pern and The Dragonriders of Pern™".

1978 novels
1978 fantasy novels
Dragonriders of Pern books
Novels by Anne McCaffrey
Books about dragons
Ballantine Books books
Books with cover art by Michael Whelan